Aage Thordal-Christensen (born October 30, 1965) is a Danish dancer, choreographer and ballet director. 

Thordal-Christensen and his wife Colleen Neary are founding directors of Los Angeles Ballet.  He has  directed the ballet since 2006.

Thordal-Christensen was the artistic director of the Royal Danish Ballet 1999-2002.

References

External links 
Los Angeles Ballet

1965 births
Living people
Danish male ballet dancers
Ballet choreographers
Ballet masters
Place of birth missing (living people)
Artists from Los Angeles